Robert or Bob Ingersoll may refer to:

Bob Ingersoll (baseball) (1883–1927), American baseball player
Bob Ingersoll (born 1952), American comic book writer and lawyer
Robert G. Ingersoll (1833–1899), American politician and agnostic orator
Robert H. Ingersoll (1859–1928), American businessman and producer of the first "Dollar Watch"
Robert S. Ingersoll (1914–2010), American businessman and diplomat
Robert Sturgis Ingersoll (1891–1973), president of Philadelphia Museum of Art from 1948 to 1964

See also
Robert Ingersoll Aitken (1878–1949), American sculptor